Flypaper (also known as a fly ribbon, fly strip, fly capture tape, or fly catcher) is a fly-killing device made of paper coated with a sweetly fragrant, but extremely sticky and sometimes poisonous substance that traps flies and other flying insects when they land upon it.  Fly paper is considered a pest control device, and is subject to regulation in many countries. In the United States of America, the device may be subject to the Federal Insecticide, Fungicide, and Rodenticide Act.

Toxicity 
The poisons used in some older types of flypaper could potentially be toxic to humans and other animals. Historically, metallic arsenic (a well-known toxin to humans) was used in flypaper. Arsenic extracted by soaking flypaper in water has been used by several convicted murderers, among them Frederick Seddon, Florence Maybrick, and the Angel Makers of Nagyrév.

Most modern brands of flypaper contain no poison, but only a non-toxic adhesive such as rosin.

Effectiveness 
Flypaper is as effective as many other methods involving insecticides or bug zappers. However, a twisted strip of flypaper hanging from the ceiling is considered by many to be aesthetically less acceptable than some other methods, and so flypaper is not as commonly used as it once was. Some formulas for flypaper also have a slight but potentially disagreeable odor. Handling and disposing of flypaper can be awkward because it is so sticky, though  vegetable oil can commonly be used to remove the adhesive. Flypaper loses its effectiveness over time when it dries up or becomes covered with dust, and it should be replaced regularly. Consideration should also be given to positioning, as it may be more or less effective in different areas of a room.

See also 
Arsenic poisoning
Fly-killing device
Insecticide
Pest control

References

Pesticides
Paper products
Flies and humans
Pest insects

fr:Attrape-mouche#Le papier tue-mouche